This article refers to one of the former prefectures of Chad. From 2002 the country was divided into 18 regions.

Lac was one of the 14 prefectures of Chad. Located in the west of the country, Lac covered an area of 22,320 square kilometers and had a population of 252,932 in 1993. Its capital was Bol.

References

Prefectures of Chad